Charles Rochester Young (1965) is an American composer, music educator, conductor and saxophonist.

Life 
Young graduated from Baylor University in Waco (Texas), where in 1988 he earned his Bachelor of Music. He then studied at the University of Michigan in Ann Arbor and earned his Master of Music in 1990. In 1993 he completed his studies with a promotion to Doctor of Musical Arts. His teachers have included Leslie Bassett, Donald Sinta, Keith Hill and Marianne Ploger. He soon became a teacher at the Interlochen Center for the Arts. Subsequently, he became Professor of Composition and Music Theory at the University of Wisconsin at Stevens Point. He was their head of the composition and music theory. Currently, he is the Associate Dean of the Baldwin Wallace Conservatory of Music.

In 1999 he was appointed by the Carnegie Foundation and the Council for the Advancement and Support of Education to "Wisconsin Professor of the Year" proclaimed.

As a composer he has won several awards including first prize in the National Flute Association Competition New Publications and first prize in the National Band Association / Merrill Jones Composition Competition. He was a prizewinner at the Vienna Modern Masters Competition. His works have been performed at well-known conferences and festivals around the world, such the World Harp Congress, the World Saxophone Congress, the Conference of the World Association of Symphonic Band and Ensembles (WASBE), the Midwest Band and Orchestra Clinic, the Music Educators National Convention, and the Montreux Jazz Festival.

Compositions

Works for Orchestra 
 1997 Fanfare to the Northern Sky, for orchestra
 1998 Wings of Fire, for solo flute, solo harp, and string orchestra
 Ascent from the Ashes
 Flights of Fancy

Works for Band 
 1997 Tempered Steel, for band 
 1998 Northern Lights, for large brass ensemble (3 trumpets, 4 horns, 2 trombones, bass trombone, euphonium, tuba) and 3 groups of percussion (I: crotales and glockenspiel; II: vibraphone, suspended cymbal, large tamtam; III: large triangle, bass drum) (This work is identical to Fanfare to the Northern Sky for orchestra)
 1999 Legends of the Northern Wind, for band
 2000 A Child’s Embrace, for band
 2000 Springtime Heralds, for band
 2001 Concert, for double bass and brass
 Fantasia
 Chaccone
 Gigue
 2003 Concert, for alto saxophone and band
 2003 With Honor and Praise, for band
 2003 Of Spirit and Splendor, for band
 2003 Songs Without Words, for band
 2004 In the Evening Quiet , for band
 2005 Ancient Blessings, for band
 Rite
 Wedding Dance
 2005 Noble Deeds, for band
 2006 Galop, for band
 2007 Where the Waters Gather, for band 
 2007 Let these words ring true, for narrator and band
 2008 Concert, for flute and band 
 2009 Variations, for piano and band

Chamber Works 
 1986 Diversions, for soprano saxophone and piano
 1987 Two Movements, for brass quintet
 1987 Sonata, for soprano saxophone and piano
 1988 Saxophone Quartet
 Fantasia
 Ritual
 Incantations
 1989 The Song of the Lark, for flute and harp
 1989 rev.1992 Excursions, for alto saxophone and marimba
 1989 October in the Rain, for electronic wind controller and mixed chamber ensemble (synthesizer, horn acoustic piano, percussion (suspended cymbal, wind chimes))
 1992 Shish-K-Bop, for saxophone quartet
 1993 The Warmth of You, for saxophone quartet
 1993 Double Vision, for soprano saxophone and piano
 1993 Wedding Fugue, for saxophone quartet
 1994 Sahib Supreme, for saxophone quartet
 1995 Lullaby for a Mourning Child, for clarinet (or soprano saxophone) and percussion
 1997 Cross Currents, for oboe, soprano saxophone, and marimba
 1997 Backtalk! A comedy, for narrator and prepared wind instrument
 1999 Festivities, for two marimbas
 2000 Three Summer Evenings, for brass quintet
 2002 Variations on an Original Theme, for violin, clarinet, and piano
 2002 Nocturne, for flute and vibraphone
 2003 Remembrance, for double bass and piano
 2005 Callings, for horn quartet

References

External links 
 
 

1965 births
Living people
American male composers
21st-century American composers
American music educators
American male conductors (music)
American male saxophonists
Baylor University alumni
University of Michigan School of Music, Theatre & Dance alumni
University of Wisconsin–Stevens Point faculty
21st-century American saxophonists
21st-century American conductors (music)
21st-century American male musicians